Biernat of Lublin (Polish:  Biernat z Lublina, Latin Bernardus Lublinius, ca. 1465 – after 1529) was a Polish poet, fabulist, translator, and physician.  He was one of the first Polish-language writers known by name, and the most interesting of the earliest ones.  He expressed plebeian, Renaissance, and religiously liberal opinions.

Life
Biernat wrote the first book printed in the Polish language: printed in 1513, in Kraków, at Poland's first  printing establishment, operated by Florian Ungler—a prayer-book, Raj duszny (Hortulus Animae, Eden of the Soul).

Biernat also penned the first secular work in Polish literature:  a collection of verse fables, plebeian and anticlerical in nature: Żywot Ezopa Fryga (The Life of Aesop the Phrygian), 1522.

Works

Raj duszny (Eden of the Soul), 1513
Żywot Ezopa Fryga (The Life of Aesop the Phrygian), 1522
Dialog Polinura z Charonem (Dialog of Polinur and Charon)

See also
Physician writer
Fable#Fabulists
Fables and Parables

Notes

References
"Biernat z Lublina" ("Biernat of Lublin"), Encyklopedia Polski (Encyclopedia of Poland), Kraków, Wydawnictwo Ryszard Kluszczyński, 1996, p. 57.

Polish poets
Medieval Polish physicians
16th-century Polish physicians
Polish medical writers
Polish translators
Fabulists
1460s births
16th-century deaths
Year of birth uncertain
Polish male poets